The 2006 Presbyterian Blue Hose football team represented Presbyterian College in the 2006 NCAA Division II football season as a member of the South Atlantic Conference. They were led by sixth-year head coach Tommy Spangler and played their home games at Bailey Memorial Stadium.

Schedule

References

Presbyterian
Presbyterian Blue Hose football seasons
Presbyterian Blue Hose football